Harold E. Weeks (c. 1890 – February 7, 1939) was an American politician from Maine. A Republican from Fairfield, Maine, Weeks served in the Maine Legislature from his election in 1920 until 1936. From 1920 to 1924, Weeks served in the Maine House of Representatives. Elected to the Maine Senate in 1924, Weeks served in the Maine Senate until 1936. During his final term (1935–1936), Weeks was elected Senate President.

Weeks graduated from Bowdoin College in 1910 in the same class as future Speaker of the Maine House of Representatives Franz U. Burkett.

Weeks committed suicide at the age of 49, at the Augusta State Hospital, by stabbing himself in the heart with a nail file. Weeks had been diagnosed with manic depressive psychosis the year before.

References

1939 deaths
People from Fairfield, Maine
Bowdoin College alumni
Republican Party members of the Maine House of Representatives
Presidents of the Maine Senate
Republican Party Maine state senators
1939 suicides
Suicides in Maine
Suicides by sharp instrument in the United States
American politicians who committed suicide
Year of birth uncertain